Fort McMurray-Lac La Biche is a current provincial electoral district in Alberta, Canada. The district will be one of 87 districts mandated to return a single member (MLA) to the Legislative Assembly of Alberta using the first past the post method of voting. It was contested for the first time in the 2019 Alberta election.

Geography
The district is located in northeastern Alberta and is named for its main communities: it includes all of Lac La Biche County and the southern half of Fort McMurray (Regional Municipality of Wood Buffalo). It also contains two reserves belonging to the Fort McMurray First Nation (Clearwater 175 and Gregoire Lake 176), all three reserves of the Chipewyan Prairie First Nation, the Heart Lake First Nation (on Heart Lake 167), the main reserve of the Beaver Lake Cree Nation, Beaver Lake 131, and one of the Saddle Lake Cree Nation's reserves (Whitefish Lake 128). Major transportation routes include Alberta Highways 36 (Veterans Memorial Highway), 55 (Northern Woods and Water Route), 63, and 881.

History

The district was created in 2017 when the Electoral Boundaries Commission recommended abolishing Lac La Biche-St. Paul-Two Hills and extending the border of Fort McMurray-Conklin southward, renaming it in the process. The new district differs from the historical Lac La Biche-McMurray district in that it does not contain the whole of Fort McMurray. Its northern boundary is formed by the Athabasca River, Thickwood Boulevard within Fort McMurray, and the Clearwater River.

In 2019, the district elected United Conservative MLA Laila Goodridge who had previously been elected to Fort McMurray-Conklin in the July 12, 2018 by-election following the resignation of Brian Jean on March 5, 2018. Goodridge had previously stood as a Wildrose candidate for Grande Prairie-Wapiti in the 2015 Alberta general election, placing third behind PC Wayne Drysdale and NDP candidate Mary Dahr. The 2019 election was in many ways a rematch of the 2018 by-election with Goodridge once again defeating Regional Municipality of Wood Buffalo councillor and NDP candidate Jane Stroud, this time by 6,231 votes.

In August 2021 Goodridge resigned as MLA to successfully run as the Conservative Party's MP candidate in Fort McMurray—Cold Lake MP in the 2021 Canadian federal election. A provincial by-election was then held in March 2022, making Brian Jean the new MLA.

Electoral results

2022 by-election

2019 general election

See also
List of Alberta provincial electoral districts

References

External links
Elections Alberta
The Legislative Assembly of Alberta

Alberta provincial electoral districts
Fort McMurray
2017 establishments in Alberta
Constituencies established in 2017